K-1 World MAX 2005 Championship Final was a kickboxing event promoted by the K-1 organization. It was the fourth K-1 World MAX final for middleweight kickboxers (70 kg/152 lb weight class), involving eight finalists and two reserve fighters, with all bouts fought under K-1 rules.  All eight of the finalists had won elimination fights at the K-1 World MAX 2005 World Tournament Open, while the reserve fighters were invited despite suffering defeats.  As well as tournament matches there were also three super fights fought under K-1 rules (70 kg/152 lb weight class).  In total there were sixteen fighters at the event, representing nine countries.

The tournament winner was shoot boxing standout Andy Souwer who defeated reigning champion and tournament favorite Buakaw Por. Pramuk by split decision in a grueling final that went into two extension rounds.  Souwer was helped in his route to the final by the fact that local hero (and one of the favorites) Masato was injured in his quarter final match and replaced by the much less renowned Yasuhiro Kazuya, who had suffered a cut in his reserve match win, something Souwer took full advantage of, winning by technical knockout.  In the super fights the most notable result saw legendary Muay Thai champion Ramon Dekkers outclass former K-1 USA winner Duane Ludwig, winning via a wide unanimous decision.  The event was held in Yokohama, Japan at the Yokohama Arena on Wednesday, July 20, 2005.

K-1 World MAX 2005 Championship Final Tournament

* Reserve Fight Kazuya Yasuhiro replaced Masato who had to withdraw from the competition due to injury

Results

See also
List of K-1 events
List of K-1 champions
List of male kickboxers

References

External links
K-1 Official Website
K-1sport.de - Your Source for Everything K-1

K-1 MAX events
2005 in kickboxing
Kickboxing in Japan
Sport in Yokohama